Hurricane Erika was a weak hurricane that struck extreme northeastern Mexico near the Texas-Tamaulipas border in mid-August of the 2003 Atlantic hurricane season. Erika was the eighth tropical cyclone, fifth tropical storm, and third hurricane of the season. It was not until later data was analyzed that the NHC revised it to Category 1 intensity in the Saffir-Simpson Hurricane Scale. The storm developed from a non-tropical area of low pressure that was tracked for five days before developing in the eastern Gulf of Mexico on August 14. Under the influence of a high pressure system, Erika moved quickly westward and strengthened under favorable conditions. It made landfall as a hurricane on northeastern Mexico on August 16, and the storm's low-level circulation center dissipated by the next day. However, the storm's mid-level circulation persisted for another three days, emerging into the East Pacific and moving northwestward over Baja California, before dissipating on August 20.

While Erika's precursor disturbance was moving across Florida, it dropped heavy rainfall. In south Texas, Erika produced moderate winds of  along with light rain, causing minor and isolated wind damage in the state. In northeastern Mexico, Erika produced moderate amounts of rainfall, resulting in mudslides and flooding. There, two people were killed when their vehicle was swept away by floodwaters.

Meteorological history

It moved southwestward, and on August 9, it generated convection as it passed beneath a cold-core upper-level low. As the system rapidly continued westward, much of the convection remained near the center of the upper-level low, preventing development of a closed surface circulation. On August 13, while located near the northwestern Bahamas, a substantial increase in convection resulted in the upper-level low building downwards to the middle levels of the troposphere, coinciding with the development of an upper level anticyclone.

A closed low-level circulation nearly developed on August 14 to the east of Key Largo, Florida, but it weakened due to the deep convection remaining to the north over the mid-level center. The mid-level storm continued westward and moved across Florida.

With well-established outflow and low levels of wind shear, Erika strengthened as the circulation became better defined. On August 15, convection organized into bands, and as its winds approached hurricane strength, an eye developed within the storm. The storm rapidly weakened over the mountainous Sierra Madre Oriental, and Erika's low-level circulation center dissipated early on August 17. The mid-level circulation maintained integrity as it crossed Mexico, and led to the formation of a tropical disturbance after entering the Gulf of California on August 18. It turned to the northwest and weakened on August 20, before dissipating soon afterward.

Operationally, Erika was never upgraded to hurricane status.

Preparations

The threat of Erika's onslaught prompted the evacuation of 51 oil platforms and 3 oil rigs in the western Gulf of Mexico. However, due to its rapid motion, the passage of the storm resulted in minimal effects on operations.

While the storm was located in the eastern Gulf of Mexico on August 15, the National Hurricane Center issued a Hurricane Watch and Tropical Storm Warning from Brownsville to Baffin Bay, Texas. The center also recommended a Hurricane Watch spanning from Soto la Marina, Tamaulipas to the international border. Late that same day, when strengthening was underway, a Hurricane Warning was either issued or recommended from La Pesca, Mexico to Baffin Bay, Texas, though the warnings for south Texas were dropped when a more southward motion occurred. Just one month after Hurricane Claudette caused millions in damage in south Texas, the fast movement of Erika caught citizens by surprise as it was forecast to make landfall near Brownsville. Citizens and business owners boarded up for the storm. About 10,000 were evacuated from northeastern Mexico due to the threat for flooding, including 2,000 in Matamoros.

Impact

The precursor disturbance was expected to bring heavy, yet needed rainfall to the Bahamas. The precursor disturbance dropped heavy precipitation while moving across Florida, including in Indian River County, and also produced  waves with moderate wind gusts.

Strong waves were reported northwards to Corpus Christi. The storm caused minor flooding and beach erosion along South Padre Island. Strong wind gusts of up to  caused isolated, minor wind damage in south Texas, including in South Padre Island, where the winds damaged the roof of a business. The winds also uprooted a large tree and caused limb damage to several small- to medium-sized trees in Brownsville. In Texas, damage totaled to $10,000 (2003 USD$,   USD).

In Mexico, Hurricane Erika primarily affected the states of Tamaulipas and Nuevo León, but also had effects on Coahuila as well. The heavy rainfall resulted in severe flooding and mudslides, blocking several highways in northeastern Mexico. In Matamoros, the storm damaged roofs and cars. Moderate winds snapped tree branches and spread debris across roads, though locals considered the storm minor. In the Nuevo León city of Montemorelos, two people died when they were swept away after they drove their truck across a partially flooded bridge. Throughout Mexico, 20,000 people were left without power due to the storm. The remnant circulation produced heavy amounts of precipitation in western Mexico and Baja California.

See also

 Tropical cyclones in 2003
 List of Texas hurricanes (1980–present)
 List of Category 1 Atlantic hurricanes
 Hurricane Barry (1983) – A Category 1 hurricane that took a similar path
 Hurricane Hanna (2020) – A Category 1 hurricane that took a similar path

References

External links

2003 Atlantic hurricane season
Category 1 Atlantic hurricanes
Hurricanes in Florida
Hurricanes in Texas
Atlantic hurricanes in Mexico
2003 natural disasters in the United States
2003 in Mexico
Erika